The 1955 Paris–Nice was the 13th edition of the Paris–Nice cycle race and was held from 12 March to 16 March 1955. The race started in Paris and finished in Nice. The race was won by Jean Bobet.

General classification

References

1955
1955 in road cycling
1955 in French sport
March 1955 sports events in Europe